USS Kerowlee was a United States Navy cargo ship in commission from 1918 to 1919.

Kerowlee was built in 1901 at South Shields, England, by J. Readhead and Sons as a commercial cargo ship. She operated under the name SS Campania during at least part of her commercial service. She was named SS Kerowlee and the property of Kerr Navigation Company of New York City by the time the United States Army took control of her at Le Havre, France, on 1 December 1917 for World War I service. The U.S. Navy acquired her from the Army at Cardiff, Wales, on 17 October 1918 and commissioned her the same day as USS Kerowlee. Unlike most commercial ships commissioned into U.S. Navy service during World War I, Kermoor never received a naval registry Identification Number (Id. No.).

Departing Cardiff on 3 November 1918 for Brest, France, Kerowlee operated between ports on the English Channel ports in England and France until 11 April 1919, carrying coal and military supplies.

Kerowlee was assigned to the United States Food Administration on 11 April 1919 to carry foodstuffs between St. Nazaire, France, and Danzig, Germany.

Transferred to a United States Shipping Board account on 1 June 1919, Kerowlee departed St. Nazaire on 8 July 1919 with a load of U.S. Army cargo for the United States. Arriving at Norfolk, Virginia, on 25 July 1919, she was decommissioned on 11 August 1919 and transferred to the U.S. Shipping Board the same day for simultaneous return to the Kerr Navigation Company.

The ship returned to commercial service as SS Kerowlee. She was wrecked in the Weser in Germany in late March 1920 and broke in two on 25 March 1920.

References

Department of the Navy Naval Historical Center Online Library of Selected Images U.S. Navy Ships USS Kerowlee (1918-1919)
NavSource Online: Section Patrol Craft Photo Archive: Kerowlee

World War I cargo ships of the United States
Ships built on the River Tyne
1901 ships
Cargo ships of the United States Navy
Maritime incidents in 1920
Shipwrecks